"Be Alright" is a song performed by the American funk band Zapp. The song was written, arranged, composed, performed and produced by Roger Troutman.

It was issued as the second and final single from the band's eponymous debut album. The song peaked at No. 26 on the Billboard R&B chart in 1981.

Chart positions

Samples
The beat of the song is notably sampled in the H-Town song "Knockin' da Boots" and the 2Pac song "Keep Ya Head Up".

References

External links
 
 

1980 songs
1981 singles
Song recordings produced by Bootsy Collins
Song recordings produced by Roger Troutman
Songs written by Roger Troutman
Warner Records singles
Zapp (band) songs
Songs written by Larry Troutman